The  is a supragovernmental organization which promotes a strengthening of relations between the People's Republic of China and Japan.  Its president is Foreign Minister Masahiko Kōmura while its vice president is Minister of Agriculture, Forestry and Fisheries Yoshimasa Hayashi.

Members
Akihiro Nishimura (politician)
Akira Amari
Yasutoshi Nishimura
Isshu Sugawara
Akira Sato
Renho
Takashi Tanihata
Akira Koike
Kantoku Teruya
Yukio Hatoyama

Former members
Nobutaka Machimura (died June 1, 2015)

China Friendship Parliamentarians' Union